Christopher Wreh (born 14 May 1975) is a retired Liberian professional footballer who played as a striker. He was a member of the Arsenal side which won the Premier League and FA Cup double during the 1997–98 season.

At international level, he won 36 caps for Liberia, scoring 11 goals, and was in their squad for the 1996 Africa Cup of Nations.

Club career
Wreh played domestically for Invincible Eleven, before signing for French Division 1 club AS Monaco as a youth. A centre forward, Wreh played for Monaco as a substitute in the 1993–94 UEFA Champions League semifinal. He had a spell on loan at Guingamp, finishing the season as the team's top scorer and playing in the 1997 Coupe de France Final, which they lost on penalties to Nice. 

Wreh signed for Arsenal in the summer of 1997 for £300,000, linking up with his former manager at Monaco, Arsène Wenger. Although fourth choice behind Ian Wright, Dennis Bergkamp and Nicolas Anelka, Wreh still played an important part in the Gunners' Double-winning 1997–98 season. Wreh scored in 1–0 Premier League wins against Wimbledon and Bolton Wanderers in March, the fifth in a 5-0 win against Wimbledon, and netted the only goal of the Gunners' FA Cup semi-final win over Wolverhampton Wanderers both in April. Wreh started in the 1998 FA Cup Final, and although he did not score, Arsenal beat Newcastle United 2–0.

Despite scoring in the 1998 FA Charity Shield against Manchester United, Wreh's form dipped and after the arrival of Thierry Henry and Davor Šuker at the club in 1999 he was squeezed out altogether. He had brief loan spells with Birmingham City, for whom he scored once, against Grimsby Town, and at AEK Athens and Den Bosch, but none of these were subsequently made permanent. He left Arsenal in 2000, having scored five times in 46 appearances.

Wreh then became somewhat of a journeyman footballer. He initially signed for Saudi Arabian side Al-Hilal, then returned to the UK in 2001 with brief stints at AFC Bournemouth and St Mirren, but fitness problems meant he rarely played; he then played non-league football for Bishop's Stortford although only one game due to repeated absenteeism and United Counties League club Buckingham Town.

In 2007, he returned to football, signing for Perseman Manokwari of the Liga Indonesia Premier Division where he brought an end to his playing days.

International career
Wreh made his debut for Liberia in 1995, and went on to win 36 caps for his country, scoring 11 goals.

Coaching career
Wreh was appointed head coach of the Liberian under-20 team in late 2014. In September 2019 he became assistant coach to the senior national team.

Personal life
Wreh's son Chris is also a striker, and currently plays for Southend United of the National League.

Honours
Guingamp
UEFA Intertoto Cup: 1996
Coupe de France runner-up: 1996–97

Arsenal
Premier League: 1997–98
FA Cup: 1997–98
FA Charity Shield: 1998, 1999

References

External links

1975 births
Living people
Liberian footballers
Liberia international footballers
Association football forwards
AEK Athens F.C. players
AS Monaco FC players
Expatriate footballers in Iran
Expatriate footballers in England
Expatriate footballers in France
Expatriate footballers in Scotland
Liberian expatriate sportspeople in England
En Avant Guingamp players
Arsenal F.C. players
Birmingham City F.C. players
AFC Bournemouth players
St Mirren F.C. players
Al Hilal SFC players
Premier League players
English Football League players
Ligue 1 players
Expatriate footballers in Greece
Persepolis F.C. players
Sportspeople from Monrovia
FC Den Bosch players
Eredivisie players
Expatriate footballers in the Netherlands
Bishop's Stortford F.C. players
1996 African Cup of Nations players
Expatriate footballers in Indonesia
Buckingham Town F.C. players
Saudi Professional League players
FA Cup Final players
Liberian expatriate sportspeople in Greece
Liberian expatriate sportspeople in Monaco
Liberian expatriate sportspeople in the Netherlands
Liberian expatriate sportspeople in Scotland
Liberian expatriate sportspeople in Iran
Liberian expatriate sportspeople in Saudi Arabia
Association football coaches
Liberian expatriate sportspeople in Indonesia